Alexandra Dulgheru (born 30 May 1989) is an inactive professional tennis player from Romania. On 11 April 2011, she achieved her career-high singles ranking of world No. 26. Her best ranking in doubles is No. 41, reached on 4 July 2011.

Personal
Her father Dumitru is a pilot, and her mother Doina is an airline coordinator. Her sister Bianca is an assistant hotel manager.
She speaks Romanian, English, and Spanish, and is currently studying economics at Bucharest Academy of Economic Studies.

Career
Her best junior result came at the 2006 Wimbledon girls' championship, where she was defeated in the quarterfinals by Tamira Paszek 6–4, 6–4. She also made the doubles final with Kristina Antoniychuk. They lost to Alisa Kleybanova and Anastasia Pavlyuchenkova 1–6, 2–6. At the end of 2008, she was No. 346 in the WTA rankings.

2009: First WTA title

In April 2009, she finished runner-up to Kimiko Date-Krumm in a $75,000 tournament in Monzon. Two weeks later, she won a $25k tournament in Bari, where she defeated Sandra Záhlavová in the final.

She made her WTA Tour debut as a qualifier in the Warsaw Open. She defeated fellow Romanian qualifier Ágnes Szatmári in the first round. She followed that up with a two-sets win over 44th-ranked Sara Errani to advance to the quarterfinals, where she beat 95th-ranked Galina Voskoboeva. She defeated world No. 36 and former world No. 5, Daniela Hantuchová, to reach her first WTA final, in which she beat Alona Bondarenko in three sets.

Her next tournament was Prague Open where she lost in the opening round to Carla Suárez Navarro. In Bad Gastein tournament, Alexandra suffered yet another opening-round exit at the hands of the fourth seeded Iveta Benešová.

In August 2009, she made her Grand Slam debut at the US Open where she lost in the first round to eighth seeded Victoria Azarenka.

At the Linz tournament, she won in the first round over Sybille Bammer in two sets, before she lost to third seeded and eventual champion, Yanina Wickmayer. She then lost in the first round of the Luxembourg Open to Wickmayer.

These results brought her to be, by the year end, world No. 52 in the WTA rankings.

2010: Reaching top 30
At the first Grand Slam championship of the year, the Australian Open, Alexandra entered both the singles and the doubles events, these being her first appearances at Melbourne. In singles, she lost in the first round to qualifier Yanina Wickmayer in three sets. In doubles, she teamed up with compatriot Edina Gallovits; they lost in the first round to American-Czech team of Carly Gullickson/Vladimíra Uhlířová, in three sets.

The first highlight of the year came at the Barcelona Open where Alexandra reached the semifinals. She defeated Sílvia Soler Espinosa, Sara Errani, Arantxa Parra Santonja, then lost in the semifinals to Roberta Vinci, 7–6, 1–6, 2–6.

Dulgheru got her first top-ten win at the Italian Open against world No. 3, Dinara Safina, 6–4, 6–7, 6–1. In the third round, Dulgheru lost to Nadia Petrova.

At the Madrid Open, she defeated Elena Dementieva in the second round 6–1, 3–6, 7–5 for her second top-ten win. In the third round, she lost to Lucie Šafářová, 7–6, 1–6, 6–7.

She won her second WTA Premier title and second WTA overall at the Warsaw Open where she was the defending champion. In the first rounds, she won over Kateryna Bondarenko and Timea Bacsinszky, in straight sets. In the quarterfinal, she defeated Bulgarian qualifier Tsvetana Pironkova. In the semifinal, she won over third seeded Li Na 6–4, 3–6, 6–4. In the final, she beat Zheng Jie in straight sets.

Grand Slam success and injury
Playing at the French Open for the first time, she defeated Lucie Hradecká 7–6, 4–6, 6–3 in the first round, and Timea Bacsinszky 6–4, 6–2 in the second. She then lost to third seeded Caroline Wozniacki, in straight sets.

In doubles, she teamed up with Alberta Brianti. They defeated the team of Jill Craybas/Anastasia Pavlyuchenkova 6–1, 6–4 in the first round. Then they lost the match against fifth seeds Gisela Dulko and Flavia Pennetta, 5–7, 6–7.

Another semifinal followed at the UNICEF Open. For the first time in her career she was a seeded player (fifth seed) and following wins over Julie Coin, Alla Kudryavtseva and Yaroslava Shvedova, Alexandra eventually lost in the semifinals to Justine Henin.

A first time appearance at Wimbledon saw her entering the all three possible draws: singles, doubles and mixed doubles. In singles, the 31st seed Alexandra, defeated in the first round Japanese veteran Kimiko Date-Krumm, in three sets. She faced in the second round qualifier Romina Oprandi who she swept through in straight sets, 6–2, 6–0. Her victorious run ended in the third round where she lost to Estonian qualifier Kaia Kanepi, 1–6, 2–6. In the doubles event she teamed up with Alberta Brianti. They lost in the first round 1–6, 2–6 to American-Kazakh team and eventual Wimbledon champions, Vania King and Yaroslava Shvedova. In the mixed-doubles section, she teamed up with Spaniard David Marrero.

At the Paris Indoor Grand Prix, second seeded Alexandra reached her fourth semifinal of the year. She won over Sandra Záhlavová, Anna Chakvetadze and Anastasija Sevastova being defeated in the semifinals by Hungarian Ágnes Szávay in three sets.

Following good form, Alexandra was second seeded at Prague Open too. In the first round, she defeated Italian Tathiana Garbin, 6–4, 2–6, 6–2. Soon after the victory she felt pain in her right knee and had to withdraw from the tournament ahead of her second round match with Slovenian Polona Hercog. The injury held her away from tennis for one month.

In August 2010, she returned to the courts preparing for the US Open Series. She entered the Cincinnati Masters where she lost in the first round to Alisa Kleybanova.

She finally found her game at the US Open where she entered both singles and doubles events. In singles, being the 25th seed she won in the first round over French Julie Coin in straight sets. She then faced in the second round Sofia Arvidsson whom she defeated also in straight sets. Her run came to an end in the third round where she lost to seventh seeded Vera Zvonareva, 2–6, 6–7. In the doubles event, partnering Magdaléna Rybáriková, Alexandra and her partner surprised in the first round third seeded Spanish duo consisting of Nuria Llagostera Vives and María José Martínez Sánchez, 6–4, 4–6, 7–6. In the second round, Alexandra and her partner defeated Edina Gallovits and Klaudia Jans in straight sets. Their run was stopped by 14th seeded Russian duo of Elena Vesnina/Vera Zvonareva who defeated Alexandra and Magdaléna in two sets.

At the end of the year, she was ranked No. 29 in the WTA rankings.

2011: High ranked 26th 
Dulgheru started off the year losing in the first round of both of her first two tournaments in straight sets. Her poor form continued at the Australian Open losing  to Ayumi Morita. Then in Miami, Dulgheru had a very good tournament. She won in the second round over Chanelle Scheepers 6–3, 6–2, and in the third round over Johanna Larsson 6–2, 6–1. In the fourth round, she beat Peng Shuai, 6–3, 6–4. In the quarterfinals Dulgheru faced Sharapova, and they played a marathon match. Dulgheru won the first set 6–3. Then Sharapova won the second set, 8–6 in the tiebreak. In the third set, at 5–4 Dulgheru served for the match, but Sharapova got a break and then won the match in the third set tiebreak 7–5. After this, Dulgheru was ranked No. 26, her best ranking so far.

At the US Open, Dulgheru upset recent Wimbledon champion and fifth seed Petra Kvitová, 7–6, 6–3 in the first round before losing in the second round to compatriot Monica Niculescu, 3–6, 0–6.

2012: Injury and fall out of top 200 
Ranked No. 65 at the beginning of the year, Dulgheru won her only (ITF) title of the year in Cali, defending Mandy Minella in three sets.

After consecutively losing openers in Bogotá, in Monterrey and in Acapulco, she played in the first round at Indian Wells with Irina Falconi, but after winning the first set 6–4, she retired in the second set (at 2–5) with a knee injury.

She came back on courts after eight months in November in a couple of ITF tournaments, yet with poor results. By the end of the year she was ranked No. 233.

2013: Slowly climbing back 
After making semifinals and then becoming winner in two ITF tournaments in Antalya, Alexandra returned to the WTA Tour with a protected ranking in Indian Wells, and defeated 6–4, 6–4 qualifier Michelle Larcher de Brito, before losing in the second round, 0–6, 6–4, 3–6 to 32nd seeded Peng Shuai. Next week, in Miami, she lost her opener to Anabel Medina Garrigues.

She received a wildcard for the qualifying tournament in Madrid, and she did qualify, but lost 5–7, 2–6 to eventual finalist Maria Sharapova in the first round. Still as a qualifier at the Palermo Ladies Open, she had to retire in the first round at 1–5 in the first set with Lourdes Domínguez Lino due to right toe injury.

In Båstad, she started better, defeating Caroline Garcia in two sets, but she then lost to Virginie Razzano 6–3, 0–6, 4–6 in the second round. In Toronto, she had to play the qualifying matches again, and she qualified for the first round, where she lost to Magdaléna Rybáriková in straight sets. In Cincinnati, she did not manage to qualify for the main draw, losing again to Sofia Arvidsson in the second qualifying round.

With a protected ranking she received an entrance directly in the first round at the US Open, and first she defeated Varvara Lepchenko in a tough three-setter, before losing 2–6, 1–6 to 13th seeded Ana Ivanovic.

Before playing some smaller ITF tournaments, she ended her WTA Tour in Seoul, where she won in straight sets against wildcard Han Sung-hee, before losing in the second round to Lara Arruabarrena in three sets.

At the end of the year, Alexandra was ranked 164th in the WTA rankings.

2014: Return to top 100
After inconsistent results on the WTA Tour, Dulgheru did very well in ITF tournaments, winning in Marseille and Dubai, and making semifinals in Campinas. The points she gathered made her climb up to No. 83 in the rankings by the end of year.

2015: Finalist in Kuala Lumpur and top 50 again

Dulgheru started her season at the Shenzhen Open. She lost in the first round to Saisai Zheng. In Sydney, she was defeated in the second round of qualifying by Kristina Mladenovic. At the Australian Open, she lost in the first round to Australian Jarmila Gajdošová.

In February, Dulgheru reached the final round of qualifying at the Dubai Championships where she was defeated by Mirjana Lučić-Baroni. Getting past qualifying in Qatar, she retired during her second-round match against third seed Caroline Wozniacki due to an upper respiratory tract infection. After she recovered from the respiratory infection, she recovered soon and made it to her third WTA Tour final of her career at the Malaysian Open. She lost the final to top seed Caroline Wozniacki. This brought her to be 72nd in the WTA rankings. Following this performance, she entered the Miami Open and qualified for the event but lost in the first round to Elena Vesnina.

Dulgheru began her clay-court season in Charleston where she again lost in the first round to Ajla Tomljanović. She then played for Romania at the 2015 Fed Cup World Group Play-offs and won both matches against Françoise Abanda and world No. 7, Eugenie Bouchard. Dulgheru then received a wildcard for the Madrid Open but retired in the third set against former French Open champion Ana Ivanovic after taking the first set.

Dulgheru had another great tournament at the Premier 5 Italian Open. She qualified for the event and defeated Misaki Doi, 12th seed Lucie Šafářová and eighth seed Ekaterina Makarova (her fourth career top-ten win). She lost to world No. 2, Simona Halep, in the quarterfinals but her performance brought her back into top 50.

Performance timeline

Only main-draw results in WTA Tour, Grand Slam tournaments, Fed Cup/Billie Jean King Cup and Olympic Games are included in win–loss records.

Singles

Doubles

WTA career finals

Singles: 3 (2 titles, 1 runner-up)

Doubles: 2 (2 runner-ups)

ITF Circuit finals

Singles: 19 (11 titles, 8 runner–ups)

Doubles: 9 (3 titles, 6 runner–ups)

Head-to-head records

Record against top 10 players
Active players are in boldface.

Top 10 wins

References

External links

 
 
 
 

1989 births
Living people
Tennis players from Bucharest
Romanian female tennis players